Arlington School is a public school in Arlington, Ohio, United States for kindergarten through 12th grade.  It is the only school in the Arlington Local School District. It is located on U.S. 68, south of Findlay, Ohio. 624 students are in the registry.

Extracurricular activities

The school's 65-member band is the Arlington All-Brass Marching Band, which has participated in Apple Blossom Parade in Winchester, Virginia, and performed at the Navy Memorial in Washington, D.C. In 2007 they participated in the nationally televised America's Thanksgiving Day Parade in Detroit. The band has also played for the President of the United States in the National Cherry Blossom Festival held in Washington D.C. The band plays every four years at this festival.

Arlington's sports teams are nicknamed the Red Devils, and are part of the Blanchard Valley Conference.

The football team was second in the regional playoffs in 2007, its first time ever in the playoffs.

Ohio High School Athletic Association State Championships

 Girls' basketball - 2012

External links
 District website

References

High schools in Hancock County, Ohio
Public high schools in Ohio